Seibert Lake is a lake in Alberta.

Lac La Biche County
Seibert Lake